Bodom can refer to:

 Lake Bodom, a lake in Finland
 Bodom (film), a 2016 Finnish horror film

See also 
 Children of Bodom